Nabaa Al Safa, is a village in Chouf District in the Mount Lebanon Governorate of Lebanon.

Populated places in Aley District